Dreyelands is a Hungarian progressive metal band formed in 2002. They won the 'Debut Album of the Year' of  Hang-Súly - Hungarian Metal Awards in 2010.

History 
Dreyelands was founded by Andras Adam Horvath and Gergely Springer in 2002. Later they were joined by Peter Ilovszky (guitar, Jozsef Nyeste (lead vocals) and Omar Gassama (drums). The band's  first lineup was completed by Zoltan Kas (keyboards).

In this early period they were playing rock and metal covers, e.g. from Dream Theater, while starting to develop their own sound.  After a demo in 2003, the band recorded its first EP, Can't Hide Away, which aired on MTV Headbangers Ball. In 2008 the band recorded its first studio album, mixed and mastered by Barnabas Hidasi.

In 2009 the band was signed by Finnish metal label Lion Music, which released the band's debut concept album, Rooms of Revelation in 2010.

In 2010 Dreyelands won the 'Debut Album of the Year' of  Hang-Súly - Hungarian Metal Awards.

The band was featured on Lion Music's project  Embrace The Sun  with a previously unreleased song, "Life is Worth the Pain". This double compilation album was a charity for the victims of the Japanese Tsunami in 2011.

Dreyelands opened for Queensrÿche, Fates Warning, Adrenaline Mob and Leprous.

Dreyelands recorded their second album "Stages", to be released without a label on the May 24, 2018.

Members
The band members are:

Nikola Mijic – lead vocals
Andras Adam Horvath – guitar
Zsolt Kovago – keyboards
Gergely Springer – bass guitar
Omar Gassama – drums

Former members
 Peter Ilovszky – guitar (2002-2004)
 Krisztian Halasz – keyboards (2002-2003)
 Zalan Kiss - guitar (2004-2005)
 Zoltan "Kazo" Kas – keyboards (2004-2009)
 Jozsef Nyeste – lead vocals (2004)
 Gyorgy Nagy – keyboards (session, 2010-2013)

Discography
Can't Hide Away (2006) - EP
Rooms of Revelation (2010)

References

External links 

Hungarian heavy metal musical groups
Progressive metal musical groups
Hungarian progressive rock groups
Musical groups established in 2002
2002 establishments in Hungary